Mike Oriard is a former professional American football player and college administrator and professor.

Early life and education

Oriard was born in Spokane, Washington. He was a standout athlete at Gonzaga Preparatory School in Spokane.

A graduate of the University of Notre Dame, he was a walk-on player in its football team.

Career
Oriard played offensive lineman for four seasons for the Kansas City Chiefs.

After retiring from football, he earned his PhD at Stanford and became a professor of English and later Associate Dean of the College of Liberal Arts at Oregon State University. His academic work has centered on American sports nonfiction in multiple media.

Works
 Dreaming of Heroes: American Sports Fiction, 1868–1980 (1982)
 Sporting with the Gods: The Rhetoric of Play and Game in American Literature (1991) 
 Reading Football: How the Popular Press Created an American Spectacle (Cultural Studies of the United States) (1998) 
 King Football: Sport and Spectacle in the Golden Age of Radio and Newsreels, Movies and Magazines, the Weekly and the Daily Press (2001) 
 Bowled Over: Big-Time College Football from the Sixties to the BCS Era (2009) 
 The End of Autumn: Reflections on My Life in Football (2009) 
 Brand NFL: Making and Selling America's Favorite Sport (2010) 
 The Art of Football: The Early Game in the Golden Age of Illustration (2017)

References

External links
Michael Oriard Oral History Interview at Oregon State University

1948 births
American football offensive linemen
Kansas City Chiefs players
Notre Dame Fighting Irish football players
Living people